David Silvers is a Democratic member of the Florida Legislature representing the state's 87th House district, which includes part of Palm Beach County.

History
Silvers unsuccessfully challenged Bill Hager for the 89th House district seat in 2014. In the November 4, 2014 general election, Silvers finished with 47.5% of the vote to Hager's 52.5%.

Florida House of Representatives
Silvers defeated two other candidates in the August 30, 2016 Democratic primary, winning 54.1% of the vote. With no Republican or third-party candidates in the race, Silvers was elected automatically.

In 2018, Silvers was challenged in the Democratic primary by Edgardo Hernandez, but Silvers prevailed with 62.7% of the vote. Silvers was reelected in the November 6, 2018 general election, winning 84.59% of the vote and defeating Green Party candidate Samson LeBeau Kpadenou.

References

|-

Democratic Party members of the Florida House of Representatives
Living people
21st-century American politicians
University of Florida alumni
University of Miami alumni
People from Miami Beach, Florida
1979 births